This is a list of museums in Oman.

Bait al Zubair
Land of Frankincense Museum
Muscat Gate Museum
Museum of Omani Heritage
National Museum of Oman
Oman Children's Museum
Oman Natural History Museum
Oman Oil and Gas Exhibition Centre
Omani Aquarium and Marine Science and Fisheries Centre
Omani French Museum
Sultan's Armed Forces Museum

See also

List of museums
Tourism in Oman
History of Oman
Culture of Oman

Museums
 
Museums
Oman
Museums
Oman